BK Ume-Trixa is a sports club in Umeå, Sweden, established in 1981. The club earlier played rink bandy and bandy, but now instead runs women's ice hockey. The women's bandy team played seven seasons in the Swedish top division.

References

External links
Official website 

1981 establishments in Sweden
Defunct bandy clubs in Sweden
Ice hockey teams in Sweden
Sport in Umeå
Ice hockey clubs established in 1981
Bandy clubs established in 1981
Ice hockey teams in Västerbotten County